Colombo West electoral district was an electoral district of Sri Lanka between July 1977 and February 1989. The district was named after the city of Colombo in Colombo District, Western Province. The district was created by the division of the Colombo South Electoral District into Colombo East and Colombo West electoral districts in July 1977. The 1978 Constitution of Sri Lanka introduced the proportional representation electoral system for electing members of Parliament. The existing 160 mainly single-member electoral districts were replaced with 22 multi-member electoral districts. Colombo West electoral district was replaced by the Colombo multi-member electoral district at the 1989 general elections, the first under the PR system, though Colombo West continues to be a polling division of the multi-member electoral district.

Members of Parliament
Key

Elections

1977 parliamentary general election
Results of the 8th parliamentary election held on 21 July 1977 for the district:

1978 parliamentary by election
Results of the parliamentary by-election held on 21 March 1978 for the district:

References

Former electoral districts of Sri Lanka
Politics of Colombo District